Mizoram Engineering College is the only engineering college in the town of Lunglei, Mizoram.

Location
The College has  of land.

History
Mizoram Engineering College was inaugurated on 3rd Feb 2019 by Prime Minister Narendra Modi. The first department to start functioning will be the Civil Engineering Department for the 2019–2020 academic session. The College has been constructed under the Rashtriya Uchchatar Shiksha Abhiyan scheme. As of December 2020 the college has still not been able to start functioning due to sub-standard level of construction with no basic amenities. The approach road, water and power requirements are still to be completed.

Departments
The College has the following departments:
Civil Engineering
Electrical Engineering
Mechanical Engineering

Facilities
Mizoram Engineering College has been constructed at a cost of 26 crores and has an Administrative  block, academic block, laboratory, library, cafetaria, student common room, boys and girls hostel. It has been built to accommodate up to 300 students.

See also
Education in India
Education in Mizoram
Mizoram University

References 

Universities and colleges in Mizoram
Colleges affiliated to Mizoram University
Lunglei